Färjestadens GoIF is a Swedish football club located in Färjestaden in Mörbylånga Municipality, Kalmar County. The settlement is located in the southern part on the island of Öland.

Background
Since their foundation Färjestadens GoIF has participated mainly in the middle and lower divisions of the Swedish football league system.  The club currently plays in Division 3 Sydöstra Götaland which is the fifth tier of Swedish football. They play their home matches at the Tallhöjdens IP in Färjestaden.

Färjestadens GoIF are affiliated to Smålands Fotbollförbund.

Recent history
In recent seasons Färjestadens GoIF have competed in the following divisions:

2011 – Division III, Sydöstra Götaland
2010 – Division III, Sydöstra Götaland
2009 – Division IV, Småland Elit Östra
2008 – Division IV, Småland Elit Östra
2007 – Division III, Sydöstra Götaland
2006 – Division III, Sydöstra Götaland
2005 – Division III, Sydöstra Götaland
2004 – Division III, Sydöstra Götaland
2003 – Division III, Sydöstra Götaland
2002 – Division III, Sydöstra Götaland
2001 – Division III, Sydöstra Götaland
2000 – Division IV, Småland Sydöstra
1999 – Division III, Sydöstra Götaland
1998 – Division III, Sydöstra Götaland
1997 – Division III, Sydöstra Götaland
1996 – Division II, Östra Götaland
1995 – Division III, Nordöstra Götaland
1994 – Division IV, Småland Sydöstra
1993 – Division IV, Småland Sydöstra

Attendances

In recent seasons Färjestadens GoIF have had the following average attendances:

Footnotes

External links
 Färjestadens GoIF – Official website
 Färjestadens GoIF on Facebook

Football clubs in Kalmar County